Paul Bittner (born November 4, 1996) is an American professional ice hockey Winger who is currently playing for Düsseldorfer EG of the Deutsche Eishockey Liga (DEL). Bittner has played major junior hockey with the Portland Winterhawks of the Western Hockey League (WHL). Bittner was rated as a top prospect who was widely projected to be a first round selection in the 2015 NHL Entry Draft. He was, however, selected 38th overall, in the second round by the Columbus Blue Jackets in the 2015 NHL Entry Draft.

Playing career
In 2012, Bittner joined the Portland Winterhawks of the Western Hockey League. and in his first year he helped the Winterhawks capture the Ed Chynoweth Cup as the 2012–13 WHL Champions. During the 2014–15 season he was rewarded for his outstanding play when he was selected to skate in the 2015 CHL/NHL Top Prospects Game.

On August 20, 2015, Bittner was signed to a three-year entry-level contract with the Columbus Blue Jackets. After attending the Blue Jackets training camp, Bittner was returned to his junior club, the Winterhawks for the 2015–16 season.  Hampered by injury, Bittner was limited to just 25 games with Portland, recording 21 points. Upon the completion of the Winterhawks season and a return to health, Bittner was reassigned to AHL affiliate, the Lake Erie Monsters, on April 13, 2016, to make his professional debut to end the regular season.

Following his fourth season within the Blue Jackets organization, Bittner as a restricted free agent was not tendered a qualifying offer, releasing him to free agency.

Bittner played two seasons in the Swedish HockeyAllsvenskan with Väsby IK and Mora IK, until he left during the 2021–22 season and opted to sign for the remainder of the season with German top flight club, Düsseldorfer EG of the DEL, on November 26, 2021.

International play
Bittner competed with Team USA at the 2013 Ivan Hlinka Memorial Tournament.

Career statistics

Regular season and playoffs

International

Awards and honors

References

External links

1996 births
Living people
American men's ice hockey left wingers
Cleveland Monsters players
Columbus Blue Jackets draft picks
Düsseldorfer EG players
Lake Erie Monsters players
Mora IK players
Portland Winterhawks players
Stavanger Oilers players
Väsby IK players